Paraguay is a rural country, and many urban residents enjoy vacationing on ranches in the countryside. While the tourism market is mainly domestic, some international tourists also visit rural Paraguay.

Activities

Rural tourism in Paraguay (while largely devoted to relaxation) includes activities such as horseback riding, swimming, boating and hiking. Areas with great biodiversity are especially popular with tourists. Many large estancias (ranches) are open to urban and foreign tourists.

Agricultural production

Typical foods include sopa paraguaya, asado, bori bori, mbeju, mandioca and staples such as rice, Chipa, and dishes made with cheese and eggs.
The main crops of Paraguay are sugarcane, corn, manioc, tobacco, coffee, peanuts, and rice; popular in-season fruits and vegetables include avocado, mango, onion, orange, tomato, grapefruit and pineapple.

Topography and tourism

Most land in Paraguay is used for agriculture and ranching, although there are still large areas of forest in some areas. The central part of the country is verdant and hilly, with characteristically-Paraguayan red soil. The south is flatter and home to wetlands, streams and marshes. The north is more mountainous than the rest of the country, with many waterfalls. The Chaco region in the west is arid and barren, with a unique array of plants and animals.

Rural accommodations

Agroganadera Jejui

Rural establishments dedicated to agriculture and livestock open their doors to tourists wishing to participate in field activities, sports or simply relax in contact with nature.  Agroganadera Jejui, 291 km from Asunción with access to Route III on the Rio Jejui, has excellent conditions for fishing and river trips; nearby are the city of San Pedro de Ycuamandiyú and Cerro Corá National Park.

Estancia Cerro León

Other nearby attractions include the town of Cerro León and the train station and Franciscan church at Pirayú.

Estancia Don Emilio

It has the last  of natural forest in the area, with a wide variety of native trees and wildlife. Nearby are the Rio Tebicuarymi, the town of Yataity (where Aho-poi, a fine linen cloth, is made) and the Ybyturuzú Nature Reserve.

Estancia Golondrina

It maintains the Ypeti Nature Reserve, which has a diversity of flora and fauna. The reserve has a visitor center and guided tours in areas of the forest with trails along the Monday River.

La Lilia

A  journey from Asunción through Ypacarai and Pirayú leads to the La Lilia estancia. Visitors can tour the Museum Camp, swim in Madama Creek, enjoy lunch and learn about typical rural tasks.
Nearby are the Campamento Cerro León, Ñandutí Town in Itauguá, the Ramón Elías Mythology Museum
and the city of Capiatá.

In rural tourism establishments, group activities are also available to promote the importance of biodiversity and a commitment to caring for natural resources and the environment.

References

External links 
Turismo Rural en Paraguay
Secretaria Nacional De Turismo

Tourism in Paraguay
Rural tourism